Chaenotheca chlorella is a species of lichen belonging to the family Coniocybaceae.

Synonym:
 Calicium chlorellum Ach., 1803 (= basionym)

References

Lichen species
Ascomycota